Afterswish is a compilation album by Ozric Tentacles, released in 1992 on Dovetail Records. It is a compilation of tracks from their early cassette releases, featuring also three new tracks.

Track listing

Disc 1
"Guzzard" (from Sliding Gliding Worlds, 1988) – 2:03
"Chinatype" (previously unreleased) – 5:33
"The Sacred Turf" (from There Is Nothing, 1987) – 3:06
"Og-Ha-Be" (from Tantric Obstacles, 1985) – 4:49
"Thyroid" (from Erpsongs, 1985) – 4:58
"Omnidirectional Bhadra" (from Sliding Gliding Worlds) – 2:55
"Afterswish" (from The Bits Between the Bits, 1989) – 2:41
"Velmwend" (from Erpsongs) – 4:34
"Travelling The Great Circle" (from There Is Nothing) – 4:09
"Secret Names" (from The Bits Between the Bits) – 5:28
"Soda Water" (from Sliding Gliding Worlds) – 4:09
"Fetch Me the Pongmaster" (from Sliding Gliding Worlds) – 6:16
"Zaii!" (previously unreleased) – 8:58

Disc 2
"Abul Hagag" (previously unreleased) – 4:47
"It's a Hup Ho World" (from Sliding Gliding Worlds) – 6:20
"The Dusty Pouch" (from Sliding Gliding Worlds) – 4:18
"Thrashing Breath Texture" (from There Is Nothing) – 3:30
"Floating Seeds" (from The Bits Between the Bits) – 5:45
"Invisible Carpet" (from There Is Nothing) – 5:24
"The Code For Chickendon" (from Sliding Gliding Worlds) – 4:48
"Kola B'pep" (from There Is Nothing) – 6:40
"Mae Hong Song" (from Sliding Gliding Worlds) – 3:17
"Symetricum" (from The Bits Between the Bits) – 4:29
"Jabular" (from There Is Nothing) – 3:53
"Sliding and Gliding" (from Sliding Gliding Worlds) – 4:52

Personnel
Ed Wynne: Guitar, Synth
Gavin Griffiths: Guitar
Joie Hinton: Synth
Tom Brooks: Synth
Steve Everett: Synth
Roly Wynne: Bass
Nick Van Gelder: Drums
Mervin Pepler: Drums
John Egan: Flutes
Paul Hankin: Percussions
Marcus C. Diess: Percussions

References

Ozric Tentacles albums
1992 compilation albums